Wadi Modaynah is the name of a seasonal watercourse and dam to the south of Shawka in Ras Al Khaimah, United Arab Emirates (UAE).

See also 
 List of wadis of the United Arab Emirates

References 

Rivers of the United Arab Emirates
Geography of the Emirate of Ras Al Khaimah